Government Degree College Shakargarh is located in  Shakargarh, Punjab, Pakistan.  It was established in 1964 and offers courses in mathematics, sciences, language, computer science, languages, history, religion and philosophy. The college was nationalized during the government of Pakistan Prime Minister Zulfikar Ali Bhutto.

References

Public universities and colleges in Punjab, Pakistan